Kuan Kam Hon is a Malaysian billionaire who is the founder and chairman of Hartalega Holdings, was appointed as Executive Chairman and Managing Director on 7 May 2007, one of the world's largest producers of nitrile rubber. Born in 1947, he began his career in 1969 at his father's Kuala Lumpur real estate development company. He still resides in the city. He ranked 10th on Forbes' 2018 list of Malaysia's 50 richest with a net worth of $2.5 billion. 

Kuan founded Hartalega Holdings in the early 1980s and controls 49.3% of the company. Hartalega plans to increase its production capacity from 22 billion to 42 billion gloves a year by 2020.

The Hartalega story began in 1988.

In 2018, Hartalega partnered with Chemical Intelligence UK to launch the first non-leaching glove that features in-built antimicrobial technology.

References

Malaysian billionaires
Malaysian businesspeople
Year of birth missing (living people)
Living people